Vaadhyar (English: Teacher) is a 2012 Malayalam film directed by debutant Nidheesh Sakthi and written by Rajesh Raghavan, Produced by N Sudhish under the banner of Lakshminath Creations, and the music is composed by Manoj George and Rinil Gowtham. The film stars  Jayasurya in the title role. The film is about an aided school teacher named Anoop Krishnan, his dream is to become an MBA holder, but circumstances force him to take up teaching profession. He is chosen to work at Kottapuram Saraswathi Vilasam U.P. School, he doesn't do his job properly as he works there with no interest and the problems that occur leads to the rest of the story.

Plot
Headmistress Subadhra runs the impoverished Saraswathi Vilasam UP School. With insufficient amenities, she teaches and provides lunch to the unprivileged children of the region. Anoop Krishnan, a youth with ambitions of his own, is forced by his mother to follow his father's footsteps and become a school teacher. Reluctant Anoop is a dispassionate teacher, but a speech from an IAS officer, a student of his father's, inspires Anoop to become an exemplary teacher like his father was. Anoop improves the school and takes charge of the institution.

Cast

Production
The film was launched by the lead actor Jayasurya on 19 April 2011. Veteran director Kamal and director Lal Jose lighted the ceremonial lamp at the function. Shooting of the film began on 5 May 2011 at Thrissur. Some portions of the film were shot at Government Engineering College, Thrissur. The shoot was on hold and started again in February.

Release and reception 

The film released on 8 June 2012 around 68 centres in Kerala, India.

Critical response
The movie got mixed to negative response from the critics. Rediff started that "It is a 'coming of age' story at one level, and transforms into something like Manikyakkallu (2011), where the hero fights against the powers that be who have ordered the closure of his school because of its non-performance and dwindling number of students"and gave it 1.5 out of 5 stars. Times of India rated it 2 out of 5 and told it is a subverted mix of elements that we enjoyed in movies like Taare Zameen Par.

Soundtrack

The soundtrack is scored by debutant Manoj George, who had earlier composed for the 2008 Kannada film "Athmiya" and the Background music, "Va Va Vaadhyare" song by R. Gautham, who had previously worked with Jayasurya starrer film Janapriyan, and the lyrics by  Santhosh Varma and Rajeev Nair Allunkal. The film has 4 songs.

References 

2010s Malayalam-language films
2012 films
Films shot in Thrissur